Smithton Airport  is an Australian regional airport located  west of Smithton, a town in Tasmania's north-west. The airport is operated by the Tasmanian Department of Infrastructure, Energy and Resources.

See also
 List of airports in Tasmania

References

External links
Official site

Airports in Tasmania
North West Tasmania